Xenophage may refer to:

 An organism involved in xenophagy, changes in established patterns of biological consumption, by individuals or groups
 Xenophage: Alien Bloodsport, a fighting game written for DOS
 Xenophage (comics), a sentient alien monster and an enemy of Venom in the Marvel Universe
 "Xenophage", an exotic Machine Gun from Destiny 2